Kosmos 262 ( meaning Cosmos 262), also known as DS-U2-GF No.1, was a Soviet satellite which was launched in 1968 as part of the Dnepropetrovsk Sputnik programme. It was a  spacecraft, which was built by the Yuzhnoye Design Bureau, and was used to study the Sun.

A Kosmos-2I 63SM carrier rocket was used to launch Kosmos 262 into low Earth orbit. The launch occurred at 09:45:01 UTC on 26 December 1968, and resulted in the successful insertion of the satellite into orbit. It took place from Site 86/4 at Kapustin Yar. Upon reaching orbit, the satellite was assigned its Kosmos designation, and received the International Designator 1968-119A. The North American Aerospace Defense Command assigned it the catalogue number 03629.

Kosmos 262 was the first satellite to study VUV (Vacuum Ultraviolet light). The satellite was also first to study soft X-Ray radiation from the stars, the Sun and the Earth's upper atmosphere. The craft used three 16-channel photometers. The results were made public in October 1969.

Kosmos 262 was the only DS-U2-GF satellite to be launched. It completed operations on 3 May 1969, before decaying from orbit and reentering the atmosphere on 18 July.

See also

1968 in spaceflight

References

Spacecraft launched in 1968
Kosmos satellites
Dnepropetrovsk Sputnik program